The Act to provide for reconciliation pursuant to titles II and V of the concurrent resolution on the budget for fiscal year 2018, is a congressional revenue act of the United States originally introduced in Congress as the Tax Cuts and Jobs Act (TCJA), that amended the Internal Revenue Code of 1986. Major elements of the changes include reducing tax rates for businesses and individuals, increasing the standard deduction and family tax credits, eliminating personal exemptions and making it less beneficial to itemize deductions, limiting deductions for state and local income taxes and property taxes, further limiting the mortgage interest deduction, reducing the alternative minimum tax for individuals and eliminating it for corporations, doubling the estate tax exemption, and set the penalty enforcing individual mandate of the Affordable Care Act (ACA) at $0.

The Act is based on tax reform advocated by congressional Republicans and the Trump administration. The nonpartisan Congressional Budget Office (CBO) reported that under the Act individuals and pass-through entities like partnerships and S corporations would receive about $1.125 trillion in net benefits (i.e. net tax cuts offset by reduced healthcare subsidies) over 10 years, while corporations would receive around $320billion in benefits. The CBO estimated that implementing the Act would add an estimated $2.289trillion to the national debt over ten years, or about $1.891trillion after taking into account macroeconomic feedback effects, in addition to the $9.8trillion increase forecast under the current policy baseline and existing $20trillion national debt.

Many tax cut provisions, especially income tax cuts, will expire in 2025, and starting in 2021 will increase over time; by 2027 this would affect an estimated 65% of the population and in that same year the law's provisions are set to be fully enacted, but the corporate tax cuts are permanent. The Senate was able to pass the bill with only 51 votes, without the need to defeat a filibuster, under the budget reconciliation process. The House passed the penultimate version of the bill on December 19, 2017. The Senate passed the final bill, 51–48, on December 20, 2017. On the same day, a re-vote was held in the House for procedural reasons; the bill passed, 224–201. The bill was signed into law by President Donald Trump on December 22, 2017. Most of the changes introduced by the bill went into effect on January 1, 2018, and did not affect 2017 taxes.

Supporters argued that the law would increase GDP growth, increase levels of business investment, increase wage and salary income for households, that the tax cuts would pay for themselves, and that the law would simplify tax codes. Opponents argued that the law would result in adverse impacts, including a higher budget deficit, higher trade deficit, greater income inequality, and lower healthcare coverage and higher healthcare costs, and a disproportionate impact on certain states and professions. Critics also argued that advocates misrepresented the law. Some of the reforms enacted by the Republicans have become controversial within key states, particularly the $10,000 cap on state and local tax deductibility, and were challenged in federal court before being upheld. According to an aggregation of polls from RealClearPolitics, 34% of Americans were in favor of the new plan, 39% not in favor, and 28% unsure.

According to a 2017 report by Tax Policy Center, taxes would be reduced by about $1,600 on average in 2018 and 2025. The top 20% of Americans by income were projected to receive roughly 65% of the tax savings. In the two years since the Act was passed, it has failed to pay for itself through increased economic growth, according to Maya MacGuineas, president of the Committee for a Responsible Federal Budget. According to Bloomberg, the Act has simplified the tax code for some, but not others, lowered corporate debt, led investment to temporarily increase before then declining, and brought money back from overseas, but did not bring back business activity.

Plan elements

Individual income tax

Under the law, there are numerous changes to the individual income tax, including changing the income level of individual tax brackets, lowering tax rates, and increasing the standard deductions and family tax credits while itemized deductions are reduced and the personal exemptions are eliminated.

Most individual income taxes are reduced, until 2025. The number of income tax brackets remain at seven, but the income ranges in several brackets have been changed and most brackets have lower rates. These are marginal rates that apply to income in the indicated range as under current law (i.e., prior Public Law 115-97 or the Act), so a higher income taxpayer will have income taxed at several different rates. A different inflation measure (Chained CPI or C-CPI) will be applied to the brackets instead of the Consumer Price Index (CPI), so the brackets increase more slowly. This is effectively a tax increase over time, as people move more quickly into higher brackets as their income rises; this element is permanent.

The standard deduction nearly doubles, from $12,700 to $24,000 for married couples. For single filers, the standard deduction will increase from $6,350 to $12,000. About 70% of families choose the standard deduction rather than itemized deductions; this could rise to over 84% if doubled. The personal exemption is eliminated—this was a deduction of $4,050 per taxpayer and dependent, unless it is in an estate or trust.

The child tax credit (CTC) is doubled from $1,000 to $2,000, $1,400 of which will be refundable. There is also a $500 credit for other dependents, versus zero under current law. The lower threshold for the high-income phaseout for the CTC changes from $110,000 AGI to $400,000 for married filers.

Mortgage interest deduction for newly purchased homes (and second homes) was lowered from total loan balances of $1million under current law to $750,000. Interest from home equity loans (aka second mortgages) is no longer deductible, unless the money is used for home improvements.

The deduction for state and local income tax, sales tax, and property taxes ("SALT deduction") will be capped at $10,000. This has more impact on taxpayers with more expensive property, generally those who live in higher-income areas, or people in states with higher rates for state tax.

The act zeroed out the federal tax penalty for violating the individual mandate of the Affordable Care Act, starting in 2019. (In order to pass the Senate under reconciliation rules with only 50 votes, the requirement itself is still in effect). This is estimated to save the government over $300billion, because up to an estimated 13million fewer people will have insurance coverage, resulting in the government giving fewer tax subsidies. It is estimated to increase premiums on the health insurance exchanges by up to 10%. It also expands the amount of out-of-pocket medical expenses that may be deducted by lowering threshold from 10% of adjusted gross income to 7.5%, but only for 2017 (retroactively) and 2018. Effective January 1, 2019, the threshold will increase to 10%.

No changes are made to major education deductions and credits, or to the teacher deduction for unreimbursed classroom expenses, which remains at $250. The bill initially expanded usage of 529 college savings accounts for both K–12 private school tuition and homeschools, but the provision regarding homeschools was overruled by the Senate parliamentarian and removed. The 529 savings accounts for K-12 private school tuition provision was left intact.

Taxpayers will only be able to deduct a casualty loss if it occurs in a federally declared disaster area.

Alimony paid to a former spouse will no longer be deductible by the payer, and alimony payments will no longer be included in the recipient's gross income. This effectively shifts the tax burden of alimony from the recipient to the payer, increases the amount of tax collected on the income transferred as alimony, and simplifies the audit trail for the IRS. This provision is effective for divorce and separation agreements signed after December 31, 2018.

Employment-related moving expenses will no longer be deductible, except for moves related to active-duty military service.

The miscellaneous itemized deduction, including tax-deductions for tax-preparation fees, investment expenses, union dues, and unreimbursed employee expenses, are eliminated.

Fewer people will pay the Alternative minimum tax because the act increases the exemption level from $84,500 to $109,400 for married taxpayers filing jointly and from $54,300 to $70,300 for single taxpayers.

The act repeals the ability to recharacterize Roth conversions.

The act exempts the discharge of certain student loans due to the death or total permanent disability of the borrower from taxable income. This provision applies only to debt discharged during tax years 2018 through 2025.

The act now taxes survivors benefits that were allocated to the children of a deceased military service member as if they were for a trust or estate, which can subject them to an income tax rate of up to 37%.

Estate tax

For deaths occurring between 2018 and 2025, estates that exceed $11.2million are subject to a 40% estate tax at time of death, increased from $5.6million previously. For a married couple aggregating their exemptions, an estate exceeding $22.4million is subject to a 40% estate tax at time of death.

Corporate tax

The corporate tax rate was changed from a tiered tax rate ranging from 15% to as high as 39% depending on taxable income to a flat 21%, while some related business deductions and credits were reduced or eliminated. The Act also changed the U.S. from a global to a territorial tax system with respect to corporate income tax. Instead of a corporation paying the U.S. tax rate for income earned in any country (less a credit for taxes paid to that country), each subsidiary pays the tax rate of the country in which it is legally established. In other words, under a territorial tax system, the corporation saves the difference between the generally higher U.S. tax rate and the lower rate of the country in which the subsidiary is legally established. Bloomberg journalist Matt Levine explained the concept, "If we're incorporated in the U.S. [under the old global tax regime], we'll pay 35 percent taxes on our income in the U.S. and Canada and Mexico and Ireland and Bermuda and the Cayman Islands, but if we're incorporated in Canada [under a territorial tax regime, proposed by the Act], we'll pay 35 percent on our income in the U.S. but 15 percent in Canada and 30 percent in Mexico and 12.5 percent in Ireland and zero percent in Bermuda and zero percent in the Cayman Islands." In theory, the law would reduce the incentive for tax inversion, which is used today to obtain the benefits of a territorial tax system by moving U.S. corporate headquarters to other countries.

One-time repatriation tax of profits in overseas subsidiaries is taxed at 8%, 15.5% for cash. U.S. multinationals have accumulated nearly $3trillion offshore, much of it subsidiaries in tax-haven countries. The Act may encourage companies to bring the money back to the U.S. at these much lower rates.

The Corporate Alternative Minimum Tax was eliminated.

The law also eliminated the net operating loss carryback, a procedure by which a company with significant losses could receive a tax refund by counting the losses as part of the previous year's tax return.  They were considered important in providing liquidity during a recession. The provision was cut in order to finance the tax cuts in the act, and was one of the largest offsets in the law.

Additionally, the domestic production activities deduction was eliminated by the Tax Cuts and Jobs Act.

Churches and nonprofit organizations

Employee compensation 
There is a 25% excise tax on compensation paid to certain employees of churches and other tax-exempt organizations. The excise tax applies to any organization that is tax-exempt under 501(c) or 501(d), a Section 521(b)(1) farmer's cooperative, Section 527 political organizations, and organizations that have Section 115(1) income that is earned by performing essential government functions.

The excise tax applies to compensation paid to certain employees in excess of $1,000,000 during the year. The employees covered under this rule are the organization's five highest-compensated employees and any employees who previous had this status after 2016. Compensation is exempt from the excise tax if the compensation is paid to medical doctors, dentists, veterinarians, nurse practitioners, and other licensed professionals providing medical or veterinary services. Compensation includes all current compensation, qualifying deferred compensation, non-qualifying deferred compensation without substantial risk of forfeiture, income under Section 457(f), and severance payments, but excluding Roth retirement contributions.

An organization may also be subject to the 21% excise tax if an organization has a deferred compensation plan in which benefits are spread over several years and then vest all at once. Severance payments exceeding triple an employee's average salary during the last five years may also be subject to the 21% excise tax.

University investment tax 
There is a 1.4% excise tax on investment income of certain private tax-exempt colleges and universities. The excise tax applies only if the institution has at least 500 tuition-paying students and more than half the students are located in the United States. The excise tax applies if the institution and its related organizations have an endowment with an aggregate fair-market value at the end of the preceding tax year of at least $500,000 per full-time student, excluding assets used directly in carrying out institution's tax-exempt purpose.

This provision has been referred to as an endowment tax, and it has been estimated that it applies to around 32 universities.

Some provisions from the earlier House bill were dropped that would have taxed graduate student tuition waivers, tuition benefits for children and spouses of employees, and student loan interest. A Senate Parliamentarian ruling on December 19 changed the exemption threshold from 500 tuition-paying students to 500 total students. Endowment funds used to carry out a college's tax-exempt purpose are excluded from the asset threshold, but Internal Revenue Service has not issued regulations specifically defining this term.

In addition, a tax deduction is now disallowed entirely for charitable contributions if the donor receives rights to receive seats to college athletic events. Formerly, 80% of the charitable contribution was considered to be a tax-deductible charitable contribution.

Parking and public transportation provided to employees 
Unrelated business income is now increased by the amount a church or other tax-exempt organization pays or incurs for qualifying parking or qualifying transportation benefits for its employees. This type of unrelated business income includes only tax-free transportation benefits provided to employees, not transportation benefits that are included in the employee's taxable wages.

Unrelated business income does not result if the employer provides free parking for employees, the majority of the parking spaces are available to the general public during the organization's normal business hours, and none of the parking spots reserved for its employees. If some parking spots are reserved for employees, then unrelated business income results from a portion of the total parking expenses, based on the percentage of parking spots that are reserved for its employees.

The Internal Revenue Service has clarified that the employer should use a reasonable method to determine the value of parking benefits provided to its employees. The value of the parking spaces should include repairs, maintenance, utility costs, insurance, property taxes, interest, snow and ice removal, leaf removal, trash removal, cleaning, landscape costs, parking attendant expenses, security, and rent or lease payments, but not depreciation expense.

A church or other tax-exempt organization would need to file Form 990-T and pay unrelated business income tax if its total unrelated business income exceeds $1,000 during the fiscal year. Netting the unrelated business income from transportation with other unrelated business income in order to reduce or eliminate the amount of tax due is allowed.

Some states and jurisdictions require all employers to provide these benefits to their employees, which may result in an organization being required to choose between paying unrelated business income tax to the federal government or being in noncompliance with state and local laws.

Unrelated business income 
Unrelated business income is now separately computed for each trade or business activity of the church or other tax-exempt organization. Losses on one trade or business can no longer be used to offset gains on another trade or business for unrelated business income purposes. Net operating losses generated before January 1, 2018, and carried forward to other tax years are not affected and can be used to offset gains from any trade or business activity. Some affected organizations are considering incorporating for-profit subsidiaries and then moving all unrelated business income to the for-profit subsidiaries, which might make all the unrelated business income count as the same category of trade or business activity, namely "income from for-profit subsidiaries". Unrelated business taxable income from transportation benefits is not considered a trade or business activity and will be applied after totaling all of the organization's unrelated business income overall.

Net operating losses are now limited to 80% of taxable income for tax years beginning after December 31, 2017. Unrelated business income tax is now assessed at the flat rate of 21%, rather than at a graduated tax rate, except for unrelated business income earned on or before December 31, 2017. Net operating losses for tax years ending after December 31, 2017 may now be carried forward to future tax years indefinitely.

Charitable contributions 
More individuals will choose to take the standard deduction rather than itemize their tax deductions because of the increase in standard deduction and limitation on itemized deduction for state and local taxes. As a result, these individuals will not see a tax savings from donations to churches or other eligible nonprofit organizations, and churches and other organizations may receive fewer charitable contributions.<ref>Pender, Kathleen (May 20, 2018). "State lags on foiling tax deductions cap". 'San Francisco Chronicle. p. D1.</ref>

The indexed estate tax exemption was doubled, which means that people may not need to include charitable contributions being written into their will in order to reduce the estate tax paid, which is expected to reduce the amount of charitable contributions given to churches and nonprofit organizations overall.

 Tax credit for paid family and medical leave 
The Tax Cuts and Jobs Act of 2017 allows a tax credit for employers that provide paid family and medical leave to employees. A 501(c)(3) organization is not eligible for the tax credit.

Miscellaneous tax provisions

The Act contains a variety of miscellaneous tax provisions, many advantaging particular special interests. Miscellaneous provisions include:
 Internal Revenue Code section 1031, which allowed the deferment of capital gains taxes on so-called "like-kind exchanges" of a wide array of real, personal, and business property, was maintained for real property but repealed for other types of property.
 A tax break for citrus growers, allowing them to deduct the cost of replanting "citrus plants lost or damaged due to causes like freezing, natural disaster or disease."
 The extension of "full expensing," a favorable tax treatment provision for film and television production companies, to 2022. The provision allows such companies "to write-off the full cost of their investments in the first year." The Joint Committee on Taxation estimates that the extension will lead to the loss of about $1billion in federal revenue per year.
 A provision ending a corporate tax exemption for certain international airlines with commercial flights to the United States (specifically, in cases where "the country where the foreign airline is headquartered doesn't have a tax treaty with the U.S., and if major U.S. airliners make fewer than two weekly trips to that foreign country"). This provision is seen as likely to disadvantage Gulf airlines (such as Etihad, Emirates and Qatar Airways); major U.S. airlines have complained that the Gulf states provide unfair subsidies to those carriers.
 Reductions in excise taxes on alcohol for a two-year period. The Senate bill would reduce the tax on "the first 60,000 barrels of beer produced domestically by small brewers" from $7 to $3.50 and would reduce the tax on the first 6million barrels produced from $18 to $16 per barrel. The Senate bill would also extend a tax credit on wine production to all wineries and would extend the credit to the producers and importers of sparkling wine as well. These provisions were supported by the alcohol lobby, specifically the Beer Institute, Wine Institute, and Distilled Spirits Council.
 Exempts private jet management companies from the 7.5% federal excise tax that is levied on tickets for commercial flights.
 A late change to the bill created what came to be called the "grain glitch", which altered an existing deduction for U.S. production in a way that allowed farmers to deduct 20% of their total sales to agricultural cooperatives. According to The New York Times, this "caused an uproar among independent agriculture businesses that say they can no longer compete with cooperatives." This glitch was corrected by the Consolidated Appropriations Act, 2018.  
 Because of a drafting error, businesses making renovations or other improvements must now use a 39-year depreciation schedule for the cost of these improvements instead of the intended 15-year period, which reduces allowable business tax deductions each year.
 The creation of opportunity zones, allowing for tax advantages for investments in low-income areas.

Arctic National Wildlife Refuge drilling
The Act contains provisions that would open  in the Arctic National Wildlife Refuge to oil and gas drilling. This major push to include this provision in the tax bill came from Republican Senator Lisa Murkowski. The move is part of the long-running Arctic Refuge drilling controversy; Republicans had attempted to allow drilling in ANWR almost 50 times. Opening the Arctic Refuge to drilling "unleashed a torrent of opposition from conservationists and scientists." Democrats and environmentalist groups such as the Wilderness Society criticized the Republican effort.

 Legislative history 
The bill was introduced in the United States House of Representatives on November 2, 2017 by Congressman Kevin Brady, Republican representative from Texas. On November 9, 2017, the House Ways and Means Committee passed the bill on a party-line vote, advancing the bill to the House floor. The House passed the bill on November 16, 2017, on a mostly-party line vote of 227–205. No Democrat voted for the bill, while 13 Republicans voted against it.House Passes Historic Debt Increase (press release), House Passes Historic Debt Increase (November 16, 2017). On the same day, companion legislation passed the Senate Finance Committee, again on a party-line vote, 14–12. On November 28, the legislation passed the Senate Budget Committee, again on a party-line vote. In the early morning hours of December 2, 2017, the Senate passed its version of the bill by a 51–49 vote. Bob Corker (R–TN) was the only Republican senator to vote against this version of the bill and it received no Democratic Party support.

Differences between the House and Senate bills were reconciled in a conference committee that signed the final version on December 15, 2017. The final version contained relatively minor changes from the Senate version. The House passed the penultimate version of the bill on December 19, 2017. In the December 19 vote, the same Republicans who voted against the original House bill still voted against it (with the exception of Tom McClintock, who voted in favor on December 19 after having voted against the original House bill). However, several provisions of the bill violated the Senate's procedural rules, which meant that the House of Representatives needed to re-vote with the objectionable provisions removed. The Senate passed the final bill, 51–48, on December 20, 2017; all Senate Republicans voted for the bill except Sen. John McCain, who was absent for health reasons. On the same day, a re-vote was held in the House; the bill passed, 224–201. President Trump then signed the bill into law on December 22, 2017.

Differences between the House and Senate bills
There were important differences between the House and Senate versions of the bills, due in part to the Senate reconciliation rules, which required that the bill impact the deficit by less than $1.5 trillion over ten years and have minimal deficit impact thereafter. (The Byrd Rule allows senators to block legislation if it would increase the deficit significantly beyond a ten-year period.) For example: 
 The House plan had four income tax brackets ranging from 12% to 39.6%, while the Senate bill kept seven brackets ranging from 10% to 38.5%.
 The House plan cut the corporate tax immediately, while the Senate plan delayed it until 2019.
 The House plan made both individual and corporate taxes "permanent" (i.e., no set expiration) while the Senate bill had most of the individual tax cuts expiring (but not the business cuts).
 The House plan did not repeal the health insurance individual mandate, while the Senate bill and final Act did.
 The House plan eliminated deductions for state, local, and sales taxes paid, and capped property deductions at $10,000. The Senate bill initially would have eliminated the state and local property tax deduction, but in the later Act, this was later changed back to a $10,000 mirroring the House version.
 The House plan allowed parents to put aside money for an unborn child's college education. The Senate bill did not include this provision.
 The House plan capped the deduction for mortgage interest to the first $500,000 mortgage debt versus the current $1million, while the Senate did not change it.
 The House plan repealed the Johnson Amendment. Neither the Senate version nor the final Act included a repeal of the Johnson Amendment.
 The House plan forbade the use of tax-exempt municipal bonds to fund professional sports stadiums. The Senate version and the final Act did not.

In final changes prior to approval of the Senate bill on December 2, additional changes were made (among others) that were reconciled with the House bill in a conference committee, prior to providing a final bill to the President for signature. The Conference Committee version was published on December 15, 2017. It had relatively minor differences compared to the Senate bill. Individual and pass-through tax cuts expire after ten years, while the corporate tax changes are permanent.

 Pre-conference vote 
 House of Representatives 

 Senate 

 Post-conference vote 

 House of Representatives 

 Senate 

 Impact 
Financial impact
The tax cuts are expected to increase deficits thereby stimulating the economy, increasing GDP and employment, relative to a forecast without those tax cuts. CBO reported on December 21, 2017: "Overall, the combined effect of the change in net federal revenue and spending is to decrease deficits (primarily stemming from reductions in spending) allocated to lower-income tax filing units and to increase deficits (primarily stemming from reductions in taxes) allocated to higher-income tax filing units". The nonpartisan Joint Committee on Taxation also estimated that the GDP level would be 0.7% higher (in aggregate, not per annum) during the 2018–2027 period relative to the CBO baseline forecast, employment level would be 0.6% higher and personal consumption level would be 0.6% higher during the 2018–2027 period on average due to the Act. These are higher levels, not higher annual growth rates, so these are relatively minor economic impacts over 10 years.

The distribution of impact by individual income group varies significantly based on the assumptions involved and point in time measured. In general, businesses and upper income groups will benefit, while lower income groups will see the initial benefits fade over time or be adversely impacted. For example, the CBO and JCT estimated that:

 During 2019, income groups earning under $20,000 (about 23% of taxpayers) would contribute to deficit reduction (i.e. incur a cost), mainly by receiving fewer subsidies due to the repeal of the individual mandate of the Affordable Care Act. Other groups would contribute to deficit increases (i.e. receive a benefit), mainly due to tax cuts.
 During 2021, 2023 and 2025, income groups earning under $40,000 (about 43% of taxpayers) would contribute to deficit reduction, while income groups above $40,000 would contribute to deficit increases.
 During 2027, income groups earning under $75,000 (about 76% of taxpayers) would contribute to deficit reduction while income groups above $75,000 would contribute to deficit increases.

The Tax Policy Center (TPC) estimated that the bottom 80% of taxpayers (income under $149,400) would receive 35% of the benefit in 2018, 34% in 2025 and none of the benefit in 2027, with some groups incurring costs. TPC also estimated 72% of taxpayers would be adversely impacted in 2019 and beyond, if the tax cuts are paid for by spending cuts separate from the legislation, as most spending cuts would impact lower- to middle-income taxpayers and outweigh the benefits from the tax cuts.

In 2018, companies spent a record-setting $1.1 trillion to buy back their own stock, and a majority of major firms (84%, as polled by the National Association for Business Economics) did not alter their hiring practice or their investment in their business in response to the tax cuts they received. This pattern was evident even in early 2018, when Bloomberg reported (based on an analysis of 51 S&P 500 companies) that an estimated 60% of corporate tax savings was going to shareholders, while 15% was going to employees. A Bloomberg Economics analysis found that, while business investment did increase in 2018, relatively little of that activity could be attributed to lower taxes. A study by the Federal Reserve Bank similarly found that corporations bought-back stock and paid down debt, rather than undertake either new capital expenditure or investment in research & development.

The law also impacts healthcare by setting at $0 the ACA individual mandate, resulting in projections of up to 13million fewer persons covered by health insurance as some younger, healthier persons will likely choose not to participate. Those in the remaining less healthy pool will pay higher insurance costs on the ACA exchanges, which will result in additional persons dropping coverage.

 Economy 

The non-partisan Joint Committee on Taxation of the U.S. Congress published its macroeconomic analysis of the final version of the Act, on December 22, 2017:
Gross domestic product would be 0.7% higher on average each year during the 2018–2027 period relative to the CBO baseline forecast, a cumulative total of $1,895billion, due to an increase in labor supply and business investment.
The Act would increase the total budget deficits (debt) by about $1trillion over ten years including macro-economic feedback effects. The effect of the tax cuts is only partially offset by incremental revenue due to the higher GDP levels. The initial deficit increase estimate without feedback effects of $1,456billion, less $384billion in feedback effects ($451billion less $66billion in higher debt service costs), results in a $1,071billion net debt increase over the 2018–2027 period. This increase is in addition to the $10trillion debt increase already in the CBO current law baseline projected over the 2018–2027 period, and the approximately $20trillion national debt that already exists.
Employment would be about 0.6% higher each year during the 2018–2027 period than otherwise. The lower marginal tax rate on labor would provide "strong incentives for an increase in labor supply."
Personal consumption, the largest component of GDP, would increase by 0.7%.
Note that for GDP, employment, and consumption, these are higher levels, not higher annual growth rates, so these are relatively minor economic impacts over ten years. The Committee for a Responsible Federal Budget (CRFB) summarized several studies that indicated a boost to annual GDP growth rates would be about 0.01% each year rather than the Administration's claims of 0.4% per year. In other words, a 2.0% annual GDP growth rate typical during the Obama era would rise to 2.01%–2.02% and not 2.4% as claimed, other things equal. The CRFB estimated that the JCT analysis implied a 0.02% annual growth rate increase, to arrive at a cumulative 0.7% GDP increase.

The Tax Policy Center (TPC) reported its macroeconomic analysis of the November 16 Senate version of the Act on December 1, 2017:
Gross domestic product would be 0.4% higher on average each year during the 2018–2027 period relative to the CBO baseline forecast, a cumulative total of $961billion higher over ten years. TPC explained that since most tax reductions would benefit high-income households (who spend a smaller share of tax reductions than lower-income households) the effect on GDP would be modest. Further, TPC reported that: "Because the economy is currently near full employment, the impact of increased demand on output would be smaller and diminish more quickly than it would if the economy were in recession."
The Act would increase the total budget deficits (debt) by $1,412billion, less $179billion in feedback effects, for a $1,233billion net debt increase (excluding higher interest costs).
The lower marginal tax rates would increase labor supply, mainly by encouraging lower-earning spouses to work more. This effect would reverse after 2025 due to expiration of individual tax provisions.

The Penn Wharton Budget Model (PWBM) estimated relative to a prior law baseline that by 2027:
The GDP level would be between 0.6% and 1.1% higher.
Debt would increase by between $1.9 trillion and $2.2 trillion, including macroeconomic feedback effects. Analysis of first-year results released by the Congressional Research Service in May 2019 includes:The Economic Effects of the 2017 Tax
Revision: Preliminary Observations, Congressional Research Service, May 22, 2019: https://fas.org/sgp/crs/misc/R45736.pdf
 "a relatively small (if any) first-year effect on the economy"
 "a feedback effect of 0.3% of GDP or less,"
 "pretax profits and economic depreciation (the price of capital) grew faster than wages"
 inflation-adjusted wage growth "is smaller than overall growth in labor compensation and indicates that ordinary workers had very little growth in wage rates"
 "the evidence does not suggest a surge in investment from abroad in 2018"
  "While evidence does indicate significant repurchases of shares, either from tax cuts or repatriated revenues, relatively little was directed to paying worker bonuses"

The tax cut was enacted three months into the 2018 fiscal year. Corporate tax receipts for the full fiscal year ended September 2018 were down 31% from the prior fiscal year, the largest decline since records began in 1934, except for during the Great Recession when corporate profits, and hence corporate tax receipts, plummeted. Analysts attributed the fiscal 2018 decline to the tax cut.

The Council of Economic Advisers had estimated in October 2017 that the corporate tax cut of the TCJA would increase real median household income by $3000 to $7000 annually, but during the first year following enactment of the tax cut the figure increased by $553, which the Census Bureau characterized  as statistically insignificant.

 Budget deficits and debt 

Fiscal year 2018 results
CBO reported that the budget deficit was $779billion in fiscal year 2018, up $113billion or 17% from 2017. The budget deficit increased from 3.5% GDP in 2017 to 3.9% GDP in 2018. Revenues fell by 0.8% GDP due in part to the Tax Act, while spending rose by 0.4% GDP. Total tax revenues in dollar terms were similar to 2017, but fell from 17.2% GDP to 16.4% GDP (0.8% GDP), below the 50-year average of 17.4%. Individual income tax receipts rose by $96billion as the economy grew, rising from 8.2% GDP in 2017 to 8.3% GDP in 2018. Corporate tax revenues fell by $92billion (31%) due primarily to the Tax Act, from 1.5% GDP in 2017 to 1.0% GDP in 2018, half the 50-year average of 2.0% GDP. Fiscal year 2018 ran from October 1, 2017 to September 30, 2018, so the deficit figures did not reflect a full year of tax cut impact, as they took effect in January 2018.

CBO forecast in January 2017 (just prior to Trump's inauguration) that revenues in fiscal year 2018 would be $3.60 trillion if laws in place as of January 2017 continued. However, actual 2018 tax revenues were $3.33 trillion, a shortfall of $270billion (7.5%) relative to the forecast. The CBO claimed that because of offsetting changes in different sources of revenue caused by the Act, the level of revenue for the fiscal year 2018 remained similar rather than declining, despite the fact that the CBO had also amended its forecasts to state that there would be $3.53 trillion in June 2017 (making the approximate shortfall $216billion) and annual tax revenues experienced a similar shortfall the previous year, when the CBO predicted $3.51 trillion in revenues, and a shortfall of $196billion occurred. However, the CBO similarly revised its predictions for 2017 revenues in August 2016, making the shortfall $106billion for 2017.

Ten-year forecasts
The non-partisan Congressional Budget Office (CBO) estimated in April 2018 that implementing the Act would add an estimated $2.289trillion to the national debt over ten years, or about $1.891trillion after taking into account macroeconomic feedback effects, in addition to the $9.8trillion increase forecast under the current policy baseline and existing $20trillion national debt.

CBO reported on December 21, 2017, that: "Overall, the combined effect of the change in net federal revenue and spending is to decrease deficits (primarily stemming from reductions in spending) allocated to lower-income tax filing units and to increase deficits (primarily stemming from reductions in taxes) allocated to higher-income tax filing units."

The Joint Committee on Taxation estimated the Act would add $1,456billion total to the annual deficits (debt) over ten years and described the deficit effects of particular elements of the Act on December 18, 2017:

Individual and Pass-Through (total: $1,127billion deficit increase)
Add to the deficit: Reducing/consolidating individual tax rates $1,214billion; doubling the standard deduction $720billion; modifying the Alternative Minimum Tax $637billion; reduce taxes for pass through business income $415billion; modification of child care tax credit $573billion.
Reduce the deficit: Repealing personal exemptions $1,212billion, repeal of itemized deductions $668billion; reduce ACA subsidy payments $314billion; alternative (slower) inflation measure for brackets $134billion.
The pass through changes represent a net $265billion deficit increase, so the remaining individual elements are a net $862billion increase.
Business/Corporate and International (total: $330billion deficit increase)
Add to the deficit: Reduce corporate tax rate to 21% $1,349billion; deductions for certain international dividends received $224billion; repeal corporate AMT $40billion.
Reduce the deficit: Enact one-time tax on overseas earnings $338billion; and reduce limit on interest expense deductions $253billion.

In a November 2017 survey of leading economists, only 2% agreed with the notion that a tax bill similar to those currently moving through the House and Senate would substantially increase U.S. GDP. The economists unanimously agreed that the bill would increase the U.S. debt.

Federal corporate tax receipts fell from an annualized level of $409billion in Q1 2017 to $269billion in Q1 2018, a direct result of the Trump tax cuts.The New York Times reported in August 2019 that: "The increasing levels of red ink stem from a steep falloff in federal revenue after Mr. Trump’s 2017 tax cuts, which lowered individual and corporate tax rates, resulting in far fewer tax dollars flowing to the Treasury Department. Tax revenues for 2018 and 2019 have fallen more than $430 billion short of what the budget office predicted they would be in June 2017, before the tax law was approved that December."

 Distribution 

By income level
On December 21, 2017, the Congressional Budget Office (CBO) released its distribution estimate of the Act:

 During 2019, income groups earning under $20,000 (about 23% of taxpayers) would contribute to deficit reduction (i.e., incur a cost), mainly by receiving fewer subsidies due to the zeroing out of the individual mandate of the Affordable Care Act. Other groups would contribute to deficit increases (i.e., receive a benefit), mainly due to tax cuts.
 During 2021, 2023, and 2025, income groups earning under $40,000 (about 43% of taxpayers) would contribute to deficit reduction, while income groups above $40,000 would contribute to deficit increases.
 During 2027, income groups earning under $75,000 (about 76% of taxpayers) would contribute to deficit reduction, while income groups above $75,000 would contribute to deficit increases.

The CBO stated that lower income groups will incur costs, while higher income groups will receive benefits: "Overall, the combined effect of the change in net federal revenue and spending is to decrease deficits (primarily stemming from reductions in spending) allocated to lower-income tax filing units and to increase deficits (primarily stemming from reductions in taxes) allocated to higher-income tax filing units."

The Tax Policy Center (TPC) reported its distributional estimates for the Act. This analysis excludes the impact of zeroing out the ACA individual mandate, which would apply significant costs primarily to income groups below $40,000. It also assumes the Act is deficit financed and thus excludes the impact of any spending cuts used to finance the Act, which also would fall disproportionally on lower income families as a percentage of their income.

 Compared to current law, 5% of taxpayers would pay more in 2018, 9% in 2025, and 53% in 2027.
 The top 1% of taxpayers (income over $732,800) would receive 8% of the benefit in 2018, 25% in 2025, and 83% in 2027.
 The top 5% (income over $307,900) would receive 43% of the benefit in 2018, 47% in 2025, and 99% in 2027.
 The top 20% (income over $149,400) would receive 65% of the benefit in 2018, 66% in 2025 and all of the benefit in 2027.
 The bottom 80% (income under $149,400) would receive 35% of the benefit in 2018, 34% in 2025 and none of the benefit in 2027, with some groups incurring costs.
 The third quintile (taxpayers in the 40th to 60th percentile with income between $48,600 and $86,100, a proxy for the "middle class") would receive 11% of the benefit in 2018 and 2025, but would incur a net cost in 2027.

The TPC also estimated the amount of the tax cut each group would receive, measured in 2017 dollars:

 Taxpayers in the second quintile (incomes between $25,000 and $48,600, the 20th to 40th percentile) would receive a tax cut averaging $380 in 2018 and $390 in 2025, but a tax increase averaging $40 in 2027.
 Taxpayers in the third quintile (incomes between $48,600 and $86,100, the 40th to 60th percentile) would receive a tax cut averaging $930 in 2018, $910 in 2025, but a tax increase of $20 in 2027.
 Taxpayers in the fourth quintile (incomes between $86,100 and $149,400, the 60th to 80th percentile) would receive a tax cut averaging $1,810 in 2018, $1,680 in 2025, and $30 in 2027.
 Taxpayers in the top 1% (income over $732,800) would receive a tax cut of $51,140 in 2018, $61,090 in 2025, and $20,660 in 2027.

In December 2019, CBO forecast that inequality would worsen between 2016 and 2021, due in part to the Trump tax cuts and policies regarding means-tested transfers. Their report had several conclusions:

 After taxes and transfers, the income of the top 1% would grow more than other income groups, continuing previous trends.
 Income of households in the bottom 99% percent would be higher than at any time in the past, adjusted for inflation, also continuing previous trends.
 For the top 1%, average federal tax rates would fall from 33% in 2016 to 30% (3 percentage points) in 2021. For the 81st to 99th percentiles, the rate would fall from 24% to 22%, and for the middle three quintiles, the rate would fall from 15% to 14%. These trends indicate worsening inequality, with larger tax reductions for higher incomes.
 The Gini index would rise, indicating slowed reduction of inequality, reversing a trend from the latter part of the Obama administration.
 Means-tested transfer programs would contribute less to reducing inequality in 2021 than they did in 2016.

 Individual vs. business 
According to the CBO, under the Senate version of the bill, businesses receive a $890billion benefit or 63%, individuals $441billion or 31%, and estates $83billion or 6%. U.S. corporations would likely use the extra after-tax income to repurchase shares or pay more dividends, which mainly flow to wealthy investors. According to the Center on Budget and Policy Priorities (CBPP), "Mainstream estimates conclude that more than one-third of the benefit of corporate rate cuts flows to the top 1% of Americans, and 70% flows to the top fifth. Corporate rate cuts could even hurt most Americans since they must eventually be paid for with other tax increases or spending cuts." Corporations have significant cash holdings ($1.9trillion in 2016) and can borrow to invest at near-record low interest rates, so a tax cut is not a prerequisite for investment or giving workers a raise. As of Q2 2017, corporate profits after taxes were near record levels in dollar terms at $1.77trillion annualized, and very high measured historically as a percentage of GDP, at 9.2%.

In 2017, the Congressional Budget Office (CBO) compared the U.S. corporate tax rates (statutory and effective rates) as of 2012 across the G20 countries:

 The U.S. federal corporate statutory tax rate of 35% (combined with state elements that add another 4% for a total of 39%), was the highest in the G20 countries. It was 10 percentage points higher than the average. While the U.S. made no changes in federal corporate tax rates between 2003 and 2012, nine of G20 countries reduced their rates.
 The U.S. average corporate tax rate of 29.0% (taxes actually paid as a share of income, after deductions and exemptions) was the third highest in the G20.
 The effective corporate tax rate of 18.6% (a measure of the percentage of income from a marginal investment) was the fourth highest in the G20.Bloomberg News reported in January 2020 that the top six American banks saved more than $32 billion in taxes during the two years after enactment of the tax cut, while they reduced lending, cut jobs and increased distributions to shareholders.

 By state 
An Institute on Taxation and Economic Policy analysis indicated the Act has more of a tax increase impact on "upper-middle-class families in major metropolitan areas, particularly in Democratic-leaning states where taxes, and usually property values, are higher. While only about one-in-five families between the 80th and 95th income percentiles in most red states would face higher taxes by 2027 under the House GOP bill, that number rises to about one-third in Colorado and Illinois, around two-fifths or more in Oregon, Virginia, Massachusetts, New York and Connecticut, and half or more in New Jersey, California and Maryland..."

 Financing of the tax cut 
The scoring by the organizations above assumes the tax cuts are deficit-financed, meaning that over ten years the deficit rises by $1.4trillion relative to the current law baseline; or $1.0trillion after economic feedback effects. However, if one assumes the tax cuts are paid for by per-household spending cuts, the distribution would be more unfavorable to lower-and middle-income persons.

According to the Tax Policy Center, the bill's effect on the financial well-being of taxpayers vary based on different financing assumptions.

 Assuming that each household pays the same dollar amount in added burden, approximately 72% of taxpayers would be worse off than current law, meaning benefits from tax cuts would be more than offset by reduced spending on their behalf
 Assuming that each household pays the same percentage of its income to cover the added burdens, approximately 64% of taxpayers would be worse off than under current law
 Assuming that each household pays the same percentage as their current income tax liability, approximately 17% of taxpayers would be worse off than current law
	
Vox journalist Dylan Matthews argued that the first scenario would be most likely because most direct government spending is directed towards low-income households, and higher income households tend to receive tax breaks rather than direct expenditures. Report from Tax Policy Center stated that the first two scenarios "appear to most closely resemble current Administration and Congressional budget proposals."

Republican politicians such as Paul Ryan have advocated for spending cuts to help finance the tax cuts, while President Trump's 2018 budget includes $2.1trillion in spending cuts over ten years to Medicaid, Affordable Care Act subsidies, food stamps, Social Security Disability Insurance, Supplemental Security Income, and cash welfare (TANF).

 Healthcare impact 

The Senate bill repeals the individual mandate that requires all Americans under 65 to have health insurance or pay a penalty, effective starting in 2019. The CBO initially estimated that 13million fewer persons would have health insurance by 2025, including 8million fewer on the Affordable Care Act exchanges and 5million fewer on Medicaid. Fewer persons with healthcare means lower costs for the government, so CBO estimated over $300billion in savings. This allowed Republicans to increase the size of the tax cuts in the bill. Health insurance premiums on the exchanges could rise as much as 10 percentage points more than they would otherwise. CBO later revised this estimate in 2018 to 7million fewer insured by 2026.

Reception

Support
Leading Republicans supported the bill, including President Donald Trump and Vice President Mike Pence, and Republicans in Congress, such as:
 Paul Ryan, Speaker of the United States House of Representatives (R-WI)
 Mitch McConnell, Majority Leader of the United States Senate (R-KY)
 Kevin Brady, United States Congressman (R-TX)
 Kevin McCarthy, House Majority Leader (R-CA)

In the Senate, Republicans "eager for a major legislative achievement after the Affordable Care Act debacle ... have generally been enthusiastic about the tax overhaul."

A number of Republican senators who initially expressed trepidation over the bill, including Ron Johnson of Wisconsin, Susan Collins of Maine, and Steve Daines of Montana, ultimately voted for the Senate bill.Jacob Pramuk, Ron Johnson and Steve Daines, two of the last Senate GOP holdouts, will back tax bill after pass-through tweak, CNBC (December 1, 2017).

The Trump Administration's Council of Economic Advisors supported the bill claimed it would have significant economic benefits.

 The CEA claimed the drop in corporate tax rates from 35 to 20% and immediate full expensing of non-structure investments (e.g., IT investments) would increase GDP growth rates by 3 to 5 percentage points over the then-baseline projections of around 2%. This projection excluded other tax cuts in the Act.
 The CEA stated the mechanism for this increased growth would be higher business investment levels due to the additional after-tax income available.
 The CEA claimed this GDP growth would result in an average $4,000 annual increase in wage and salary income for households.

President Trump and Treasury Secretary Mnuchin claimed the tax cuts would pay for themselves. However, later analysis showed this to be false, with revenues actually declining.

President Trump's chief economic advisor Gary Cohn stated that "The wealthy are not getting a tax cut under our plan" and that the plan would cut taxes for low- and middle-income households. Further, Trump claimed that the tax plan "...was not good for [him] [personally]."

Republican supporters of the tax bill characterized it as a simplification of the tax code. While some elements of the legislation have simplified the tax code, other provisions in fact added additional complexity. For most Americans, the process for filing taxes under the new legislation would be similar to what it was before.

 Opposition 

Democrats opposed the legislation, viewing it as a giveaway to corporations and high earners at the expense of middle class communities. Every House Democrat voted against the bill when it came to the House floor; they were joined by 13 Republicans who voted against it.

The top congressional Democrats—Senate Minority Leader Chuck Schumer of New York and House Minority Leader Nancy Pelosi—strongly oppose the bill. Schumer said of the bill that "The more it's in sunlight, the more it stinks." Pelosi said the legislation was "designed to plunder the middle class to put into the pockets of the wealthiest 1 percent more money. ... It raises taxes on the middle class, millions of middle-class families across the country, borrows trillions from the future, from our children and grandchildren's futures to give tax cuts to the wealthiest and encourages corporations to ship jobs overseas."

The 13 House Republicans who voted against the bill were mostly from New York, New Jersey, and California, and were opposed to the $10,000 cap on the state and local income tax deduction, which benefits those states.

Billionaire and former Mayor of New York Michael Bloomberg called this tax bill an "economically indefensible blunder" arguing that companies would not invest more because of the tax cuts: "Corporations are sitting on a record amount of cash reserves: nearly $2.3 trillion. That figure has been climbing steadily since the recession ended in 2009, and it's now double what it was in 2001. The reason CEOs aren't investing more of their liquid assets has little to do with the tax rate."

Bill Gates and Warren Buffett also thought that Trump's tax cut would not help businesses. In a CNBC interview, Buffett even said: "I don't need a tax cut in a society with so much inequality".

In a letter made public on the November 12, 2017, more than 400millionaires and billionaires (which include George Soros and Steven Rockefeller) asked Congress to reject the Republican tax plan. They note that it would disproportionately benefit the wealthy, while adding at least $1.5 trillion in tax cuts to the current national debt. This deficit "would leave us unable to meet our country's current needs and restrict us in advancing any future investments," the letter continues.The Economist has also been critical of the tax cut and its lack of long-term vision: "The expiry of tax cuts for individuals is a ticking time-bomb in the tax code. It will explode just as America approaches a budget crisis, driven by rising spending on health care and pensions for the elderly. This gap will probably eventually be plugged by a combination of tax rises and spending cuts. But by cutting taxes now, Republicans have moved the starting point for any future negotiations.".The Financial Times argued that this bill was "built for plutocrats" as it would mainly benefit very high income households ("45 per cent of the tax reductions in 2027 would go to households with incomes above $500,000 – fewer than 1 per cent of filers"). It concluded by stating: "The US the world once knew is drowning in a tide of unconscionable and apparently unlimited greed. We are all now doomed to live with the unhappy consequences.".

The Editorial Board of The New York Times vigorously opposed the bill: "This bill is bad enough. No less revolting is the dishonest and sneaky way it was written." In an article published in August 2018, it noted that none of the benefits that the GOP promised had been delivered. Corporate investments did not increase, real wages were down and corporate tax revenue plummeted. The article ended with the following statement: "Today, many Republicans seem to realize that the tax cut has become a political liability. Even they realize that it doesn't do any of what they promised.".

Editorial Boards of major US newspapers including USA Today, The Washington Post, the Los Angeles Times, the San Francisco Chronicle and The Boston Globe also opposed the bill.

 Minor impact on economic growth 
Paul Krugman disputed the Administration's primary argument that tax cuts for businesses will stimulate investment and higher wages:

 Foreigners own about 35% of U.S. equities, so as much as $700billion of the tax cut will go overseas, as corporate after-tax income will flow to these investors as stock buybacks and dividends.
 CEOs indicate that tax cuts are not a big factor in investment decisions.
 Significantly increasing capital expenditures requires an inflow of foreign capital, strengthening the dollar, increasing trade deficits and potentially costing up to 2.5million manufacturing and supporting jobs.

In November 2017, the University of Chicago asked over 40 economists if U.S. GDP would be substantially higher a decade from now, if either the House or Senate bills were enacted, with the following results: 52% either disagreed or strongly disagreed, while 36% were uncertain and only 2% agreed.

The Tax Policy Center estimated that GDP would be 0.3% higher in 2027 under the House bill versus current law, while the University of Pennsylvania Penn Wharton budget model estimates approximately 0.3–0.9% for both the House and Senate bills. The very limited effect estimated is due to the expectation of higher interest rates and trade deficits. These estimates are both contrary to the Administration's claims of 10% increase by 2027 (about 1% per year) and Senator Mitch McConnell's estimate of a 4.1% increase.

Federal Reserve Bank of NY President and CEO William C. Dudley stated in January 2018: "While this legislation will reduce federal revenues by about 1 percent of GDP in both 2018 and 2019, I anticipate the boost to economic growth will be less than that. Most importantly, most of the tax cuts accrue to the corporate sector and to higher-income households that have a relatively low marginal propensity to consume. This suggests that a significant portion of the tax cuts will be saved, not spent."

The Trump administration predicted the tax cut would spur corporate capital investment and hiring. One year after enactment of the tax cut, a National Association for Business Economics survey of corporate economists found that 84% reported their firms had not changed their investment or hiring plans due to the tax cut. Later in 2019, the Economic Policy Institute analyzed the data on business investment from the federal Bureau of Economic Analysis and concluded that, "if the TCJA’s corporate rate cuts were working, we would be seeing a permanent rise in investment. Instead, investment growth is cratering." Analysis conducted by The New York Times in November 2019 found that average business investment was lower after the tax cut than before, and that firms receiving larger tax relief increased investment less than firms receiving smaller tax relief. The analysis also found that since the tax cut firms increased dividends and stock buybacks by nearly three times as much as they increased capital investments.

 Limited or no wage impact 

Corporate executives indicated that raising wages and investment were not priorities should they have additional funds due to a tax cut. A survey conducted by Bank of America-Merrill Lynch of 300 executives of major U.S. corporations asked what they would do with a corporate tax cut. The top three responses were that they would pay down debt, conduct stock buybacks, and conduct mergers. An informal survey of CEOs by Trump advisor Gary Cohn resulted in a similar response, with few hands raised in response to his request for them to do so if their company would invest more.

Former Clinton cabinet Treasury Secretary Larry Summers referred to the analysis provided by the Trump administration of its tax proposal as "...some combination of dishonest, incompetent, and absurd." Summers wrote that the Trump administration's "central claim that cutting the corporate tax rate from 35 percent to 20 percent would raise wages by $4,000 per worker" lacked peer-reviewed support and was "absurd on its face."

On December 20, 2017, the day the final bill was passed by the House, Wells Fargo, Fifth Third Bancorp and Western Alliance Bancorp announced they would raise the minimum wage of its workers to $15 an hour upon signing of the bill. A number of companies announced bonuses for workers, including AT&T which said it will give a $1,000 bonus to every single one of its 200,000 employees as a result of the Tax Cut bill. Democratic Senator Chuck Schumer stated that these were the exception to the rule and that AT&T was in litigation with the government over a pending merger. He stated: "There is a reason so few executives have said the tax bill will lead to more jobs, investments, and higher wages—because it will actually lead to share buybacks, corporate bonuses, and dividends."

In the immediate aftermath of the passage of the Act, a relatively small number of corporations—many of them involved in mergers disputed by the government or regulatory difficulties—announced pay raises or bonuses to employees, although it is not clear they would not have done so without the tax cut (many companies award raises and bonuses early each year in the normal course of business, after their prior year earnings are known and their new budgets are put in place). About 18 companies in the S&P did so; when companies paid awards to employees, these were usually a small percentage of corporate savings from the Act. A January 2018 study from the firm Willis Towers Watson found that 80% of companies were not "considering giving raises at all." Bloomberg reported in March 2018 that an estimated 60% of corporate tax savings were going to shareholders, while 15% was going to employees, based on analysis of 51 S&P 500 companies. In July 2018, Bloomberg reported that real wages have actually fallen in the first quarter after the tax bill went into effect.

 Increases income and wealth inequality The New York Times editorial board explained the tax bill as both consequence and cause of income and wealth inequality: "Most Americans know that the Republican tax bill will widen economic inequality by lavishing breaks on corporations and the wealthy while taking benefits away from the poor and the middle class. What many may not realize is that growing inequality helped create the bill in the first place. As a smaller and smaller group of people cornered an ever-larger share of the nation's wealth, so too did they gain an ever-larger share of political power. They became, in effect, kingmakers; the tax bill is a natural consequence of their long effort to bend American politics to serve their interests." The corporate tax rate was 48% in the 1970s and is 21% under the Act. The top individual rate was 70% in the 1970s and is 37% under the Act. Despite these large cuts, incomes for the working class have stagnated and workers now pay a larger share of the pre-tax income in payroll taxes.

The share of income going to the top 1% has doubled, from 10% to 20%, since the pre-1980 period, while the share of wealth owned by the top 1% has risen from around 25% to 42%. Despite President Trump promising to address those left behind, the House and Senate bills would increase economic inequality:

 Sizable corporate tax cuts would flow mostly to wealthy executives and shareholders;
 In 2019, a person in the bottom 10% would average a $50 tax cut, while a person in the top 1% gets a $34,000 tax cut;
 Up to 13million persons losing health insurance or subsidies are overwhelmingly in the bottom 30% of the income distribution;
 The top 1% receives approximately 70% of the pass-through income, which will be subject to much lower taxes;
 Rolling back the estate tax, which only impacted the top 0.2% of estates in 2016, is a $150billion benefit [Note: $83billion in final bill] to the ultra-rich over ten years.
 The top 1% of households by wealth own 40% of stocks; the bottom 80% just 7%, even when including indirect ownership through mutual funds.
 According to a Gallup survey, 52% of Americans owned some stock in 2016, down from 65% in 2007.

In 2027, if the tax cuts are paid for by spending cuts borne evenly by all families, after-tax income would be 3.0% higher for the top 0.1%, 1.5% higher for the top 10%, −0.6% for the middle 40% (30th to 70th percentile) and −2.0% for the bottom 50%.

 International tax standards 
In November 2017, the OECD reported that the U.S. tax burden was lower in 2016 than the OECD country average, measured as a percentage of GDP:

 Overall taxes, including many state and local taxes, were 26.0% GDP in 2016, versus the OECD average of 34.3%.
 Income taxes were 8.5% GDP in 2016, versus the OECD average of 8.9%.
 Corporate taxes were 2.3% GDP in 2011, versus the OECD average of 3.0% GDP. Despite this, the US corporate tax rate was 35% prior to the passage of the Tax Cuts and Jobs Act, ten percentage points higher than the OECD average of 25%; the TCJA reduced the American corporate tax rate to 21%, four percentage points lower than the OECD average at the time.
Journalist Justin Fox wrote in Bloomberg that Americans may feel financial pressure due to healthcare and college tuition costs, which are much higher than other OECD countries measured as a share of GDP, offsetting the benefit of the already lower tax structure.

 International trade issues 
A potential consequence of the proposed tax reform, specifically lowering business taxes, is that (in theory) the U.S. would be a more attractive place for foreign capital (investment money). This inflow of foreign capital would help fund the surge in investment by corporations, one of the stated goals of the legislation. However, a large inflow of foreign capital would drive up the price of the dollar, making U.S. exports more expensive, thus increasing the trade deficit. Paul Krugman estimated this could adversely impact up to 2.5million U.S. jobs.

According to The New York Times, "wide range of experts agree that cutting taxes is likely to increase the trade deficit" with other countries, which conflicts with the stated priority of the White House to reduce the trade deficit. However, Economists widely reject that reducing the trade deficit necessarily has to be good for the economy. So the fact that this bill may increase the trade deficit will not necessarily decrease American welfare.

 Foreign objections 
The finance ministers of the five largest European economies (France, Germany, Italy, Spain and the United Kingdom) wrote a letter to U.S. Treasury Secretary Steve Mnuchin, expressing concern that the tax reforms could trigger a trade war, as they would violate World Trade Organization rules and distort international trade. Similar concerns were voiced by China. In response to the Act, German economists called for the German government to enact tax reform and additional subsidies to prevent a loss of jobs and investments to the United States.

 Conflict of interest 
Fact-checkers such as FactCheck.Org, PolitiFact and The Washington Posts fact-checker have found that Trump's claims that his economic proposal and tax plan would not benefit wealthy persons like himself were likely false. An analysis by The New York Times found that if Trump's tax plan had been in place in 2005 (the one recent year in which his tax returns were leaked), he would have saved $11million in taxes. The analysis also found that Trump would save $4.4million on his eventual estate tax bill. Experts say that the financial windfall for the President and his family from this bill is "virtually unprecedented in American political history".

A number of Republican congressmen also stood to benefit personally from the pass-through deduction. Most notably, retiring Tennessee Senator Bob Corker was for some time the sole Republican Senator to oppose the tax plan. Corker stated that he would not support a tax plan that would increase the deficit. However, after Arizona Senator John McCain, who was unable to vote while receiving treatment for brain cancer, endorsed the bill, Corker changed his vote to "yes" on the final version of the bill after it was confirmed that the pass-through deduction provision from which he stood to benefit was included in it. Corker rejected the claim that he traded his vote for provisions that benefited him and said that he had no idea that there were provisions in the bill from which he stood to personally benefit.

 Tax complication 
According to The New York Times, "economists and tax experts across the political spectrum warn that the proposed system would invite tax avoidance. The more the tax code distinguishes among types of earnings, personal characteristics or economic activities, the greater the incentive to label income artificially, restructure or switch categories in a hunt for lower rates." According to The Wall Street Journal, the bill's changes to "business and individual taxation could lead to a new era of business reorganization and tax-code gamesmanship with unknown consequences for the economy and federal revenue collection."

Republicans justified the tax reform initially as an effort to simplify the tax code. Kevin Brady, the chairman of the House Ways and Means Committee, and Speaker Paul Ryan said in November 2017 that they would simplify the tax code so much that 9 in 10 Americans would be able to file their taxes on a postcard. President Donald Trump said on December 13, 2017, that people would be able to file their taxes "on a single, little, beautiful sheet of paper". However, when the final version of the tax legislation passed through houses of Congress, the legislation kept most loopholes intact and did not simplify the tax code. The announcements by the House leaders hurt the stock prices of tax preparers, but upon the release of the actual bill, the stock prices of tax preparers sharply increased.

 Procedural concerns 
The legislation was passed by Congress with little debate regarding the comprehensive reforming nature of the Act.Jim Tankersley & Alan Rappeport, "A Hasty, Hand-Scribbled Tax Bill Sets Off an Outcry", The New York Times (December 1, 2017).] The 400-page House bill was passed two weeks after the legislation was first released, "without a single hearing" held. In the Senate, the final version of the bill did not receive a public hearing, "was largely crafted behind closed doors, and was released just ahead of the final vote." Republicans rewrote major portions of tax bill just hours before the floor vote, making major changes in order to win the votes of several Republican holdouts. Many last-minute changes were handwritten on earlier drafts of the bill. The revisions appeared "first in the lobbying shops of K Street, which sent back copies to some Senate Democrats, who were left to take to social media in protest regarding being asked to vote in a matter of hours on a massive bill that had yet to be shared with them directly."

The rushed approval of the legislation prompted an outcry from Democrats. Senate Minority Leader Charles Schumer (D-NY) proposed giving senators more time to read the legislation, but this motion failed after every Republican voted no. Requests to wait until incoming Democratic Senator Doug Jones of Alabama could vote on the bill were also denied. Some commentators also criticized the process. The New York Times editorial board wrote that the Senate's move to rapidly approve the bill "is not how lawmakers are supposed to pass enormous pieces of legislation" and contrasted the bill to the 1986 tax bill, in which "Congress and the Reagan administration worked across party lines, produced numerous drafts, held many hearings and struck countless compromises." Bloomberg columnist Al Hunt classified the legislation as a "slipshod product, legislated with minimal transparency" that was "rushed so fast through a short-circuited lawmaking process" in which many members of Congress who voted in favor of the bill did not fully understand what they had done.

 Name of the law 
The clause establishing the bill's short title was dropped after Senator Bernie Sanders (D-VT) filed an objection under the Byrd Rule to the Senate Parliamentarian, claiming the section was extraneous. As a result, the name "Tax Cuts and Jobs Act", though widely used, is not contained in the bill, which is officially referred to by its long title, or as Public Law 115-97.

 Federal Reserve 
Federal Reserve officials had indicated earlier in 2017 that aggressive tax cuts could increase the pace of interest rate increases already planned. Higher interest rates make borrowing more expensive, slowing economic growth (GDP), other things equal. The Fed also raises interest rates to help offset the risk of inflation in a growing economy near full employment. However, as the tax plan became clearer and its impact on the economy was judged to be relatively minor, the Fed indicated that a plan to raise interest rates incrementally as many as three times in 2018 would not be changed.Binyamin Appelbaum, "A Trump Economic Boom? The Fed May Stand in the Way", The New York Times (December 13, 2016).

Views of economists
While there is no clear consensus among academic economists as to whether the tax plan would benefit the economy to the degree that Trump administration predicted, there is a consensus that it will widen public deficits and economic inequality.

In a survey conducted by the University of Chicago's Initiative on Global Markets, 37 out of 38 economists interviewed stated that they thought the Act would cause a rapid increase in the national debt. The one dissenting economist later changed his mind. Conversely, only one economist (Stanford's Darrell Duffie) out of the 38 agreed with the statement: "If the US enacts a tax bill similar to those currently moving through the House and Senate—and assuming no other changes in tax or spending policy—US GDP will be substantially higher a decade from now than under the status quo".

Four winners of the Nobel Prize in Economics have spoken out against the legislation: Joseph Stiglitz, Paul Krugman, Richard Thaler, and Angus Deaton.

Princeton economist Alan Blinder, who served as Vice Chair of the Federal Reserve System from 1994 to 1996, argued, in an article published by The Wall Street Journal, that "almost everything was wrong" with the Trump Tax Cut and that "it blew a large hole in the federal deficit".

A group of 137 economists signed an open letter expressing support for the bill; the letter was touted by President Trump, House Speaker Paul Ryan and the Senate Finance Committee as support for the legislation among economists; the letter was criticized by left-liberal publications that cited independent research which contradicted some of its claims and alleged that it contained signatories who did not exist. A group of nine economists (largely from the Reagan and Bush administrations) wrote a letter which estimated 3 percent growth from the reduction in the corporate tax rate within a decade; the letter was challenged by Harvard economists Larry Summers and Jason Furman (both of whom served in the Obama administration), and the nine economists appeared to back off from their original claims.

According to The Guardian, thirteen tax law professors from around the US, in a 68-page study, called the law's process "rushed and secretive" that resulted "in deeply flawed legislation".

 Political significance 

In November 2017, Senator Lindsey Graham (R-SC) said that "financial contributions will stop" flowing to the Republican Party if tax reform is unable to be enacted. This echoed comments by Representative Chris Collins (R-NY), who said, "My donors are basically saying 'get it done or don't ever call me again.'"

Excluded provisions before passage
Some provisions were initially proposed for inclusion in the bill, but were excluded before final passage.

Tuition waiver exemption
The bill that passed the House had been criticized for its significant negative impact on graduate students. Graduate students in private universities could have seen their effective tax rate go above 41.9%, a rate higher than what even the richest of Americans typically pay. The change was due to a provision in the bill that would have repealed the deduction for qualified tuition and related expenses, meaning that graduate students' waived tuition would be viewed as taxable income. Given that their stipends are significantly less than the waived tuition, this would typically increase their taxes by 30–60% for public universities and hundreds of percent for private ones. The Senate version of the bill did not contain these provisions.

The House bill's disadvantageous treatment of graduate students was criticized because of its projected negative effect on the training of U.S. scientists. The bill's impact on U.S. science and innovation had been criticized by Stanford professor emeritus Burton Richter, a winner of the Nobel Prize in Physics and the National Medal of Science, who critiqued the bill's negative impact on Americans seeking advanced degrees and wrote that the budget impact of the tax cuts would force a dramatic reduction in federal funding for scientific research.

The final version of the Act reflected the Senate's language in this area, maintaining the prior law's tax exemption for tuition waivers.

Automatic spending cuts averted/PAYGO
Under the Statutory Pay-as-You-Go Act of 2010 (PAYGO), laws that increase the federal deficit will trigger automatic spending cuts unless Congress votes to waive them. Because the Act adds $1.5trillion to the deficit, automatic cuts of $150billion per year over ten years would have applied, including a $25billion annual cut to Medicare. Because the PAYGO waiver is not allowed in a reconciliation bill, it requires separate legislation which requires 60 votes in the Senate to end a filibuster. If Congress had not passed the waiver, it would have been the first time that statutory PAYGO sequestration would have occurred. However, the PAYGO waiver was included in the continuing resolution passed by Congress on December 22 and signed by President Trump.

 Public opinion 
Analysis by FiveThirtyEight in November 2017 found the pending tax law to be the least-popular major tax bill in at least 36 years, including the tax increases of 1990 and 1993. Apart from February 12, 2018, the RealClearPolitics composite of polls has indicated that at least a plurality of Americans has disliked the law from October 2017 through December 2018.

Follow-on bills

House Republicans have written follow-on bills that would extend the individual tax cuts beyond their current expiration date, simplify the rules for Individual Retirement Accounts, and add new tax deductions for small businesses.

The follow-on bills were written as three separate bills, named the Protecting Family and Small Business Tax Cuts Act of 2018 (H.R. 6760), the Family Savings Act (H.R. 6757), and the American Innovation Act of 2018 (H.R. 6756).

On September 27, the House of Representatives passed the Family Savings Act by a vote of a 240–177, and then it passed the American Innovation Act by a vote of 260–156."H.R.6756: American Innovation Act of 2018". 115th Congress. Retrieved November 26, 2018.

On September 28, the House of Representatives passed the Protecting Family and Small Business Tax Cuts Act by a vote of 220–191."H.R.6760: Protecting Family and Small Business Tax Cuts Act of 2018". 115th Congress. Retrieved November 26, 2018. Several Republicans in the House voted against the bill to make permanent the $10,000 annual limit on federal tax deductions for state and local taxes because they represent states where residents tend to pay higher state and local taxes.

The Build Back Better Act, in the version passed by the House in November 2021 (to be reconciled with the Senate), repeals or partially reverses various provisions of the 2017 act, according to the summary given by House speaker Nancy Pelosi in her speech on the morning of passage.

Subsequent events
The zeroing out of the individual mandate, through this Act led to several states led by Texas to challenge the constitutionality of the entire ACA based on the Supreme Court's prior decision in National Federation of Independent Business v. Sebelius (2012) which justified the individual mandate as an allowable tax. In December 2018, Judge Reed O'Connor of the District Court of Northern Texas issued his opinion in agreement with the states that without the individual mandate, the whole of the ACA had no standing. California and several other states led the appeal of the case to the Fifth Circuit Court. The Fifth Circuit affirmed in part with O'Connor's opinion on the unconstitutionality of the ACA without the individual mandate in December 2019. The case was raised to the Supreme Court to be heard as California v. Texas'' during the court's 2020–21 term; in a 7–2 decision issued on June 17, 2021, the Court ruled that Texas and other states that initially challenged the individual mandate did not have standing, as they had not shown past or future injury related to the provision. The Supreme Court otherwise did not rule on the constitutionality of the individual mandate in this case.

See also
 Bush tax cuts
 Reagan tax cuts
 Revenue Act of 1964

Explanatory notes

References

External links

 Tax Cuts and Jobs Act of 2017 (PDF) as enacted in the US Statutes at Large
  via Congress.gov
 Tax Foundation's calculator to see effect of the law on you
 Taxpayer Advocate Service Tax Reform Changes Website 

2017 in American law
2017 in economics
Acts of the 115th United States Congress
Articles containing video clips
Presidency of Donald Trump
United States federal reconciliation legislation
United States federal taxation legislation